Freya or UC1 Freya (in Danish: Freja) was the first private Danish submarine, and thus first amateur electric sub in Denmark. It was built by Peter Madsen and Claus Nørregaard in 2001–2002, as a demonstrator to try submarine technology. Having made over 500 dives, it was decommissioned, as it was not designed for a long service life. It was decommissioned in 2006 after UC2 Kraka had been worked up. The submarine was then docked and allowed to decay. Final decontamination was done, and it was towed out to sea by UC3 Nautilus, in August 2008, and sunk as an artificial reef near Copenhagen.
Freya is named after the Norse goddess of fertility and love.

Construction
The sub was built at Peter Madsen's workshop in Farum, Denmark. Freya was completed in 2002. It was built with only an electric drive, a 3.1-kW Sauer-Danfoss 24V DC electric motor. The electric motor was sourced from a forklift. It could reach  on the surface or  submerged. Freya was not equipped with an air compressor, which limited the time length of dives. The sub could hold 2 people. As UC1 was a prototype, it was built out of regular steel, for enhanced strength, over aluminum or fibreglass, and making it cheaper than stainless steel. Operating costs originally were about 6 DKK worth of electricity for a couple of hours cruising.

History
Freya was completed in 2002, and she was put to sea, starting voyages.
In July 2002, out of the water for inspection and refit, it was crushed by a transport accident, when the truck it was on passed under a low bridge, and the attached crane was knocked over, crushing the conning tower and central portion. Insurance monies paid by the transport company were used to pay for repairs, making it seaworthy again, later in 2002. The repairs were done by Madsen and company.

After decommissioning, it was sunk to the bottom of the Øresund.

References

Midget submarines
2002 ships
Individual watercraft
Peter Madsen